The St. Joseph Cathedral is a Roman Catholic church located in the town of Gambela, Gambela Region, Ethiopia.

Follow the Roman or Latin Rite and depends in religious terms of the Apostolic Vicariate of Gambella (Vicariatus Apostolicus Gambellensis) which was created on 16 November 2000. As the name indicates its patron saint is St. Joseph. Nearby also is the Gambela National Park.

See also
Cathedral of the Holy Saviour, Adigrat
Apostolic Vicariate of Gambella
Roman Catholicism in Ethiopia

References

 St. Jo
Gambela Region